Jeanna Michaels (May 9, 1956 - May 23, 2018) was an American actress, known for her soap opera roles as Lydia Saunders on Santa Barbara (1988–89), Constance Townley on General Hospital (1983) and Karen Richards on The Young and the Restless (1981–82). Between 1979–81, she portrayed Bobby Ewing's first secretary, Connie Brasher, on Dallas. She died from Lymphoma.

Television roles
Dallas as Connie Brasher (33 episodes, 1978-1981)
The Young and the Restless as Karen Richards (1981-1982)
 General Hospital as Constance Townley (1983)
 Safe at Home as Tatum McCoy (1985-1986)
Santa Barbara as Lydia Saunders (1988-1989)
Generations as Madame Rosa (1991)
Who's the Boss? season 2 episode 18 “When worlds collide” as Emily (1986)

References

External links
 

1956 births
2018 deaths
American television actresses
American soap opera actresses
Actresses from Connecticut
21st-century American women